The 2020 West Virginia Republican presidential primary was held on June 9, 2020 along with the Georgia primary on the same day. All 35 of West Virginia's delegates to the 2020 Republican National Convention were allocated according to the results. 

Donald Trump won the primary and all of the state's delegates.

Results

References

West Virginia
Republican
West Virginia Republican primaries